The Andrew Gemant Award is a prize awarded by the American Institute of Physics to a person who has made substantial cultural, artistic, or humanistic contributions to physics.  The award is named after Andrew Gemant, a pioneer in materials science.

Award winners

See also
 List of physics awards

References

Awards of the American Institute of Physics
Science communication awards
Awards established in 1987